Brian Barnwell is an American lawyer and politician, who served as a Democratic member of the New York State Assembly. Since January 2017 until December 2022, he has represented Assembly District 30 in Queens; the district includes Maspeth, Woodside, Middle Village, and portions of Astoria, Sunnyside, Elmhurst, Rego Park and Long Island City.

Early life, education, and family
Born in New York City on April 24, 1986, Brian Barnwell has been a longtime Woodside resident. He comes from a middle-class family of law enforcement officers, nurses and teachers. Barnwell graduated cum laude from Arizona State University with a Bachelor of Arts degree in political science. He went on to earn his J.D. degree from Albany Law School.

During his time in law school, Barnwell worked for the Albany County District Attorney's Office and for the Albany Law School Civil Rights and Disabilities Law Clinic.

Career
After graduating from law school, Barnwell went into private practice and practiced general law. Barnwell then worked as an aide in Queens City Council Member Costa Constantinides’s office. Barnwell first announced in July 2015 that he would seek the District 30 seat in the Assembly; at the time, he was a political newcomer. Incumbent Democratic Assemblymember Margaret Markey had been elected to the seat nine times.

In the September 2016 Democratic primary, Barnwell defeated Markey 1,710 votes to 1,082. One report on the election result stated that "[this] might be one of the biggest political upsets Queens has ever seen." After defeating Republican candidate Tony Nunziato by a large margin in the November 2016 general election, Barnwell took office in January 2017.

In the summer of 2018, Barnwell was named to City & State's "Albany 40 Under 40" He joins other "figures crafting groundbreaking legislation, shaping public opinion and driving the news cycle."

New York State Assembly 

Since his time in office, Barnwell has introduced legislation that provides tax relief for seniors and the middle class. Barnwell also drafted legislation to attempt to reform the affordable housing formula, and proposed bills that would allow for tougher sentencing on violent felons. Barnwell has also pushed a bill that would outlaw the sale of puppies by "puppy mills." Barnwell has been the primary sponsor on many other pieces of legislation. He has worked to create bills that hold the government accountable and promote citizen well-being.
 
Barnwell is the chair of the Subcommittee on Emerging Workforce within the New York State Assembly. Barnwell also serves as a member of the Committee on Aging, the Committee on Banks, the Committee on Children and Families, the Committee on Labor, the Committee on Libraries and Education Technology, the Committee on Real Property Taxation, the Asian Pacific American Task Force, and the Puerto Rican/Hispanic Task Force.

Electoral history

References

External links
New York State Assemblyman Brian Barnwell official site
Brian Barnwell's Twitter
Brian Barnwell's Instagram
Brian Barnwell's Facebook

1986 births
Living people
21st-century American politicians
People from Woodside, Queens
Politicians from Queens, New York
Democratic Party members of the New York State Assembly
Arizona State University alumni
Albany Law School alumni
American prosecutors